Tuđman or Tudjman can refer to:

 Ankica Tuđman (1926–2022), wife of Franjo Tuđman and mother of Miroslav Tuđman
 Franjo Tuđman (1922–1999), Croatian politician, President of Croatia 1990–1999
 Miroslav Tuđman (1946–2021), Croatian scientist and politician

Croatian surnames